George Longman (1852–1938) was an English cricketer.

George Longman may also refer to:

George Longman (MP)  (1776–1822)

See also
Longman family tree, showing the relationship between the above